Gilan is a province of Iran.

Gilan or Ghilan may also refer to:

Places 
Gilan, Kerman, a village in Kerman Province, Iran
Gilan, Khuzestan, a village in Khuzestan Province, Iran
Gilan, Kurdistan, a village in Kurdistan Province, Iran
Gilan, Lorestan, a village in Lorestan Province, Iran
Gilan, Semnan, a village in Semnan Province, Iran
Gilan-e Gharb, a city in Kermanshah Province, Iran
Gjilan, a town in Kosovo, formerly known as Gilan and Ghilan
Janda, a town in Afghanistan
Soviet Republic of Gilan, a short-lived Soviet republic in the province of Gilan, Iran

People 
Maxim Ghilan, the Israeli poet and activist

See also

Gilak (disambiguation)
Gilaki (disambiguation)
Gilani (disambiguation)
Giljan (Serbian Cyrillic: Гиљан), the old name for Gnjilane (Albanian: Gjilan)
Jilan (disambiguation)
Yilan (disambiguation)